Jacob Ernst von Reider (1784 – December 1853 in Ludwigsstadt, Bavaria) was a German zoologist and botanist.

Reider wrote "Fauna Boica, oder gemeinnützige Naturgeschichte der Thiere Bayerns" (Zeh Nuremberg, 1830–1835) with Carl Wilhelm Hahn and "Gartenbau als die höchste Kultur des Grund und Bodens in Deutschland" (Leipzig 1821). He was a prolific writer on agriculture and horticulture, publishing treatises on flax, sugar substitutes, tobacco, hops, fruit trees, cactus, viticulture, medicinal plants, various flowers and ornamental plants, et al.

References
Allgemeine Deutsche Biographie 27 (1888)

External links
 Deutsche-Biographie
 Wikisource DE

19th-century German zoologists
19th-century German botanists
German horticulturists
1784 births
1853 deaths